The 1994 Tirreno–Adriatico was the 29th edition of the Tirreno–Adriatico cycle race and was held from 9 March to 16 March 1994. The race started in Nettuno and finished in San Benedetto del Tronto. The race was won by Giorgio Furlan of the Gewiss–Ballan team.

General classification

References

1994
1994 in Italian sport